Dichagyris grotei is a species of cutworm or dart moth in the family Noctuidae.

The MONA or Hodges number for Dichagyris grotei is 10869.

References

Further reading

 
 
 

grotei
Articles created by Qbugbot
Moths described in 1983